

im

ima-ime
imafen (INN)
imagabalin (USAN, INN)
Imagent (Targeson)
imanixil (INN)
imatinib mesylate (INN)
imazodan (INN)
imcarbofos (INN)
imciromab (INN)
Imdur (AstraZeneca)
imecasermin (INN)
imeglimin (INN)
imepitoin (INN)
imetelstat (USAN, INN)
imexon (INN)

imi-imp
imiclopazine (INN)
imidafenacin (INN)
imidapril (INN)
imidaprilat (INN)
imidazole salicylate (INN)
imidocarb (INN)
imidoline (INN)
imiglucerase (INN)
imiloxan (INN)
iminophenimide (INN)
imipenem (INN)
imipramine (INN)
imipraminoxide (INN)
imiquimod (INN)
imirestat (INN)
imisopasem manganese (USAN, INN)
Imitrex (GlaxoSmithKline)
imitrodast (INN)
Imodium (McNeil Consumer Healthcare)
imolamine (INN)
imoxiterol (INN)
impacarzine (INN)
impromidine (INN)
improsulfan (INN)

imu
imuracetam (INN)
Imuran (GlaxoSmithKline)

in

ina-inc
inakalant (INN)
inalimarev (USAN)
inaperisone (INN)
Inapsine (Akorn Pharmaceuticals)
incadronic acid (INN)
incobotulinumtoxinA (USAN)
incyclinide (USAN, INN)

ind

inda-indi
indacaterol (USAN)
indacrinone (INN)
Indahexal (Hexal Australia) [Au]. Redirects to indapamide.
indalpine (INN)
indanazoline (INN)
indanidine (INN)
indanorex (INN)
indantadol (INN)
indapamide (INN)
indatraline (INN)
indecainide (INN)
indeglitazar (INN)
indeloxazine (INN)
indenolol (INN)
Inderal
Inderide (Pfizer)
indibulin (USAN)
Indimacis-125
indinavir (INN)
indiplon (USAN)
indisetron (INN)
indisulam (USAN)
indium (111In) altumomab pentetate (INN)
indium (111In) biciromab (INN)
indium (111In) capromab pendetide (INN)
indium (111In) igovomab (INN)
indium (111In) imciromab (INN)
indium (111In) satumomab pendetide (INN)

indo-indr
Indo-Lemmon
indobufen (INN)
indocate (INN)
Indocin
indolapril (INN)
indolidan (INN)
indometacin (INN)
indomethacin (INN)
Indomethegan
indopanolol (INN)
indopine (INN)
indoprofen (INN)
indoramin (INN)
indorenate (INN)
indoxole (INN)
indriline (INN)

inf-ino
Infants' Feverall
Infasurf Preservative Free
Infed (Actavis)
Inflamase Forte
Inflamase Mild
infliximab (INN)
Infumorph
Infuvite
ingenol mebutate (USAN, INN)
INH
inicarone (INN)
iniparib (USAN)
Injectapap
Innofem
Innohep
Innopran XL
Innovar
Inocor
inocoterone (INN)
inogatran (INN)
inolimomab (INN)
inolitazone (INN)
inotuzumab ozogamicin (INN)
Inomax (Ikaria)
inosine (INN)
inositol nicotinate (INN)

inp-ins
Inpersol
inproquone (INN)
Inspra (Pfizer)
Instant Microspheres
Insulatard NPH Human (Novo Nordisk)
insulin (INN)
insulin argine (INN)
insulin aspart (INN)
insulin defalan (INN)
insulin degludec (INN)
insulin detemir (INN)
insulin glargine (INN)
insulin glulisine (USAN)
insulin lispro (INN)
insulin zinc suspension (amorphous) (INN)
insulin zinc suspension (crystalline) (INN)

int-inv
Intal
intedanib (INN)
Integrilin (Merck)
Intelence (Janssen Pharmaceutica)
interferon alfa (INN)
interferon alfacon-1 (INN)
interferon beta (INN)
interferon gamma (INN)
intermedine (INN)
intetumumab (USAN, INN)
intoplicine (INN)
Intralipid (Baxter International)
intrazole (INN)
intriptyline (INN)
Intron A (Schering Corp)
Intropin (DuPont)
Invagesic (Sandoz)
Invanz (Merck)
Invega (Janssen Pharmaceutica)
Inversine
Invirase (Roche)